Let's Talk About is an Australian comedy television series which first screened on Presto. The series is the first commission produced for Presto. The series is about a couple who deal with an unexpected pregnancy. It is written, directed and stars Matilda Brown, along with Richard Davies.

Cast
 Matilda Brown as Claire
 Richard Davies as Ben

Guest cast
 Bryan Brown
 Lisa Hensley
 Bruce Spence
 Steve Le Marquand

References

2015 Australian television series debuts
English-language television shows
Australian comedy television series